Pontus Åsbrink (born 27 June 1992) is a Swedish footballer who currently plays for Akropolis IF as a right winger.

Career
Åsbrink left IFK Mariehamn at the end of 2018.

References

External links

1992 births
Living people
Association football forwards
Swedish footballers
Allsvenskan players
Superettan players
Veikkausliiga players
Ettan Fotboll players
IF Brommapojkarna players
IK Frej players
Spånga IS players
Gröndals IK players
IFK Mariehamn players
Akropolis IF players